Cory Young (born 6 March 1971) is a former Australian rules footballer who played for Richmond and West Coast in the Victorian/Australian Football League (VFL/AFL).

In two seasons at Richmond, Young only managed six games and spent the rest of his time in the reserves. He was drafted by West Coast in 1991 but again struggled to break into the seniors due to injuries. Young made just one appearance, a win over Essendon at Windy Hill mid-season, contributing three disposals and a goal. He infamously disagreed with coach Mick Malthouse's feedback after that game, and was never seen again at the top level.

After leaving the AFL he played in the Victorian Football Association. He was captain of the Oakleigh Football Club in 1994 and won the J. J. Liston Trophy that season, the club's final season before becoming a feeder club for Springvale. He also played briefly with Frankston.

References

External links

Holmesby, Russell and Main, Jim (2007). The Encyclopedia of AFL Footballers. 7th ed. Melbourne: Bas Publishing.

1971 births
Living people
Richmond Football Club players
West Coast Eagles players
Oakleigh Football Club players
Frankston Football Club players
J. J. Liston Trophy winners
Australian rules footballers from Melbourne
Subiaco Football Club players